"Put It On Me" is the second single from Ja Rule's second studio album, Rule 3:36. It was released through The Island Def Jam Music Group, Def Jam Recordings and Irv Gotti's Murder Inc. Records. The song also appeared on The Fast and the Furious soundtrack and also in the film Double Take. The song features female Murder Inc. rapper Vita, with Vita's verse being written by Caddillac Tah.  The song's original version appeared on Rule 3:36 and just featured Ja Rule and Vita, but then a remix version was made with vocals by Lil' Mo on the chorus of the song. Ja Rule explained that the lyrics of the song were inspired by an argument he had with his wife to show how important she is to him. It peaked at number 8 on the Billboard Hot 100 on the week of March 19, 2001, making it Ja Rule's first top ten hit on the chart.

Accolades
In 2001, the song's music video became the first to retire on BET's 106 & Park after spending more than 60 days on the countdown. The video also topped BET's Notarized: Top 100 Videos of 2001.
In September 2001, the video was nominated for "Best Rap Video" at the 2001 MTV VMAs.
In 2002, "Put It on Me" won two BMI Awards under "Urban Music" and "Pop Music". The song also attained an ASCAP Rhythm & Soul Music Award, alongside the honorary "Songwriter of the Year" award to Murder Inc. executive, Irv Gotti.

Charts

Weekly charts

Year-end charts

References

2000 singles
Ja Rule songs
Lil' Mo songs
Songs written by Irv Gotti
Songs written by Lil' Mo
Music videos directed by Hype Williams
2000 songs